The eighth season of Adventure Time, an American animated television series created by Pendleton Ward, premiered on Cartoon Network on March 26, 2016, and concluded on February 2, 2017, and was produced by Frederator Studios and Cartoon Network Studios. It follows the adventures of Finn, a human boy, and his best friend and adoptive brother Jake, a dog with magical powers to change shape and size at will. Finn and Jake live in the post-apocalyptic Land of Ooo, where they interact with the other main characters of the show: Princess Bubblegum, The Ice King, Marceline the Vampire Queen, Lumpy Space Princess, BMO, and Flame Princess.

Tom Herpich, Steve Wolfhard, Jesse Moynihan, Laura Knetzger, Kris Mukai, Lyle Partridge, Graham Falk, Charmaine Verhagen, Sam Alden, Pendleton Ward, Seo Kim, Somvilay Xayaphone, Hanna K. Nyström, Ako Castuera, Aleks Sennwald, Polly Guo, Kent Osborne, and Adam Muto storyboarded and wrote the season. The miniseries Islands, which follows Finn, Jake, BMO (voiced by Niki Yang), and Susan Strong (voiced by Jackie Buscarino) as they leave Ooo and travel across the ocean to solve the mystery of Finn's past, aired during this season. It also features guest animators Alex and Lindsay Small-Butera (who worked on "Beyond the Grotto") and James Baxter (who worked on "Horse and Ball").

The season debuted with the episode "Broke His Crown", which was watched by 1.13 million viewers marking a slight decrease from the previous season finale, "The Thin Yellow Line", which was seen by 1.15 million viewers. "Islands Part 8: The Light Cloud," the eighth-season finale, was watched by 1 million viewers, making it the lowest-rated Adventure Time season finale at the time. Critical reception to the season was mostly positive, with The A.V. Club writer Oliver Sava expressing pleasant bemusement that the show's quality had not suffered despite this season being its eighth. Critics were also complimentary towards the Islands miniseries: In April 2017, Common Sense Media awarded the miniseries "The Common Sense Seal", and at the 69th Primetime Creative Arts Emmy Awards in 2017, the Islands episode "Imaginary Resources" won a Primetime Emmy Award for Outstanding Individual Achievement in Animation. Several compilation DVDs that contain episodes from the season have been released, and a set containing the entire season was released on September 4, 2018.

Development

Concept
The series follows the adventures of Finn the Human, a human boy, and his best friend Jake, a dog with magical powers to change shape, grow, and shrink at will. Finn and Jake live in the post-apocalyptic Land of Ooo, where they interact with the other major characters, including: Princess Bubblegum, The Ice King, Marceline the Vampire Queen, Lumpy Space Princess, BMO, and Flame Princess. Common storylines revolve around Finn and Jake discovering strange creatures, dealing with the antagonistic, but misunderstood, Ice King, and battling monsters in order to help others. Multi-episode story arcs for this season include the introduction of the character Fern, and Finn meeting his mother and learning about what became of humanity.

Production

On July 7, 2015, The Hollywood Reporter announced that the series had been renewed for an eighth season. The season's storyline writers included Jack Pendarvis, Adam Muto, Kent Osborne, and Ashly Burch. Originally, the show's seventh season was supposed to comprise the episodes "Bonnie & Neddy" through "Reboot", and its eighth season was supposed to include the episodes "Two Swords" through "Three Buckets", but when it came time to upload the seventh season onto streaming sites, Cartoon Network chose to end the season with its 26th episode, "The Thin Yellow Line." Consequently, the episodes "Broke His Crown" through "Reboot" (which had originally been ordered as the last episodes of the show's seventh season) and the episodes "Two Swords" through the Islands miniseries (which had originally been ordered as the beginning of the show's eighth season) were combined to form the show's official eighth season. This new episode count was cemented by the release of the complete seventh season DVD on July 18, 2017, which included episodes up until "The Thin Yellow Line", as well as the release of the complete eighth season on the Cartoon Network website.

This season's episodes were produced in a process similar to those of the previous seasons. Each episode was outlined in two-to-three pages that contained the necessary plot information. These outlines were then handed to storyboard artists, who created full storyboards. Design and coloring were done at Cartoon Network Studios in Burbank, California, and animation was handled overseas in South Korea by Rough Draft Korea and Saerom Animation. Continuing a tradition that started with the fifth season episode "A Glitch is a Glitch", this season also features the work of guest animators. "Beyond the Grotto" features 7 minutes of animation courtesy of Alex and Lindsay Small-Butera, a husband and wife duo known for their web series Baman Piderman, and the episode "Horse and Ball" features animation courtesy of James Baxter. He had previously provided guest animation for the fifth-season episode "James Baxter the Horse". In both episodes, James Baxter the animator lends his voice to the equine character of the same name.

Storyboard artists who worked on this season include: Tom Herpich, Steve Wolfhard, Jesse Moynihan, Laura Knetzger, Kris Mukai, Lyle Partridge, Graham Falk, Charmaine Verhagen, Sam Alden, Pendleton Ward, Seo Kim, Somvilay Xayaphone, Hanna K. Nyström, Ako Castuera, Aleks Sennwald, Polly Guo, Kent Osborne, and Adam Muto. This was the final season to feature several long-serving storyboard artists and production crew members. Moynihan left the show after completing "Normal Man" to finish his web comic Forming. Finally, supervising director Andres Salaff left after this season to storyboard on Cartoon Network's series Uncle Grandpa. Conversely, the season also saw the return of former storyboard artist Ako Castuera (who returned to storyboard the episode "Broke His Crown" with Nyström before working as a storyboard revisionist, starting with "Two Swords"). and former storyboard artist and creative director Cole Sanchez (who took the position of one of the series' supervising directors starting with "Two Swords").

Miniseries

During the eighth season of Adventure Time, the miniseries Islands aired at the end of January and the beginning of February 2017. This event was first hinted at before the airing of the first Adventure Time miniseries Stakes (2015) when head story writer Kent Osborne revealed that the show would likely produce several more miniseries. Islands tells the story of Finn, Jake, BMO (voiced by Niki Yang) and Susan Strong (voiced by Jackie Buscarino) leaving Ooo and traveling across the ocean to solve the mystery of Finn's past. During their trip, they encounter various creatures, new friends, and a variety of mysterious islands. The voyage culminates with a trip to Founder's Island, where Finn learns what happened to the rest of the human race and meets his mother, Minerva (voiced by Sharon Horgan).

Cast
The season's voice actors include: Jeremy Shada (Finn the Human), John DiMaggio (Jake the Dog), Tom Kenny (The Ice King), Hynden Walch (Princess Bubblegum), and Olivia Olson (Marceline the Vampire Queen). Ward himself provides the voice for several minor characters, including Lumpy Space Princess. Former storyboard artist Niki Yang voices the sentient video game console BMO in English, as well as Jake's girlfriend Lady Rainicorn in Korean. Polly Lou Livingston, a friend of Pendleton Ward's mother, Bettie Ward, plays the voice of the small elephant Tree Trunks. Jessica DiCicco voices Flame Princess, Finn's ex-girlfriend and the sovereign of the Fire Kingdom. Andy Milonakis voices N.E.P.T.R., a sentient robot who makes and throws pies. Justin Roiland provides the voice of the Earl of Lemongrab. Several episodes, including most of the episodes in the Islands miniseries, feature Jackie Buscarino, who voices Susan Strong. The Adventure Time cast records their lines together as opposed to doing it individually. This is to capture more natural sounding dialogue among the characters. Hynden Walch has described these group session as akin to "doing a play reading—a really, really out there play."

In addition to the regular cast members, episodes feature guest voices from a range of professions, including actors, musicians, and artists. In the season opener "Broke His Crown", both Lena Dunham and Pamela Adlon reprise their characters Betty and Gunter the dinosaur. Dan Mintz, Henry Rollins, and Laura Silverman return to reprise their roles as T.V., Bob, and Ethel in "Lady Rainicorn of the Crystal Dimension". This episode also features former storyboard artist Bert Youn and comedian Fred Stoller voicing the rainicorns Lee and Roy. The episode "I Am a Sword" guest stars Amy Sedaris, Agee, and Melinda Hill; Sedaris plays Bandit Princess, Agee plays a Merchant and Science Cat, and Hill plays Space Bear and Sharon the spiky person. Storyline writer Ashly Burch plays Bun Bun in the titular episode, which also features Keith David reprising his role as the former Flame King. In "Elemental", Lauren Lapkus is introduced as the voice of ice elemental, Patience St. Pim. "Five Short Tables" sees the return of Madeleine Martin, Roz Ryan, Donald Glover, Grey DeLisle, and Emo Philips; they voice Fionna, Cake, Marshall Lee, Ice Queen, and Cuber. The episode also guest stars Hannibal Buress as Flame Prince, Crispin Freeman as Turtle Prince and Ice President, Keith Ferguson as Prince Gumball (standing in lieu of the character's original voice actor, Neil Patrick Harris, who was unavailable due to prior commitments), and Elle Newlands as Butterscotch Butler. "The Music Hole" features several guest actors, including Ashley Eriksson as the titular Music Hole, and Jackie Buscarino as Susan Strong. Alia Shawkat voices Charlie, Rich Sommer voices Grand Prix, and Reggie Watts voices the turtle announcer in "Daddy-Daughter Card Wars". "Preboot" sees the return of Buscarino as Susan Strong and Collin Dean as Tiffany; the episode also introduces Lennon Parham as Dr. Gross. Rainn Wilson reprises his role as Rattleballs, as well as voicing the adult version of Sparkle in "Reboot". The episode "Two Swords" introduces the character of Fern, voiced by Hayden Ezzy. The next episode, "Do No Harm", sees both Jeff Bennett and Hill reprise their roles as the Grass Wizard and Doctor Princess, respectively. In "Wheels", Marc Evan Jackson reprises his role as Kim Kil Whan, and Rae Gray guest stars as Jake's granddaughter, Bronwyn. Ron Lynch returns as Mr. Pig in "High Strangeness". "Horse & Ball" features British animator James Baxter, who voices the horse of the same name. Alan Tudyk returns to voice the character Chatsberry in "Jelly Beans Have Power". The Islands miniseries features Josh Fadem as Whipple the sea-dragon, Helena Mattsson as Alva, Reggie Watts as Vinny, Jasika Nicole as Frieda, Livvy Stubenrauch as young Kara/Susan, Sharon Horgan as Finn's mother Minerva, and Laraine Newman as the Widow. The miniseries also sees Lennon Parham reprise her role as Dr. Gross and Stephen Root return to voice Finn's father, Martin.

Other characters are voiced by Dee Bradley Baker, Maria Bamford, Steve Little, and Melissa Villaseñor.

Broadcast and reception

Broadcast

Much like the sixth and seventh seasons, the eighth season of Adventure Time featured several "bomb" weeks, or weeks when new episodes debuted every day. The first of these began on January 23, 2017, with "Two Swords"/"Do No Harm" and concluded on January 27, 2017, with "Jelly Beans Have Power". The second week-long string of episodes occurred between January 30 and February 2, 2017, during which the whole of Islands aired.

Ratings
The season debuted on March 26, 2016, with the episode "Broke His Crown". It was watched by 1.13 million viewers and scored a 0.3 Nielsen rating in the 18 to 49-year-old demographic. Nielsen ratings are audience measurement systems that determine the audience size and composition of television programming in the United States. In this case the episode was seen by 0.3 percent of all households with viewers aged between 18 and 49 years old. This marked a slight decrease in viewership compared to the season seven finale, "The Thin Yellow Line", which was seen by 1.15 million individuals, but it marked a marginal increase compared to the previous season's premiere, "Bonnie & Neddy" which had 1.07 million viewers. The season concluded with the eight-part miniseries Islands. This string of episodes saw an uptick in viewers, with the first two episodes scoring a 0.3 Nielsen rating in the 18- to 49-year-old demographic and being watched by 1.2 million viewers. During the week that Islands aired, Adventure Time attained viewership numbers over 1 million for every episode. Despite this, "Islands Part 8: The Light Cloud" was still the lowest-rated finale for the show at the time of its airing.

Reviews and accolades

In a review for the episode "The Music Hole", The A.V. Club writer Oliver Sava wrote, "I love that after seven seasons the show hasn't lost sight of what makes it so compelling to such a wide audience." Each episode was also graded by The A.V. Club with a different letter grade; Islands received an A, and the rest of the season received nine B's, and nine A's. The A.V. Club did not review "Daddy-Daughter Card Wars" because episodic coverage of the series was intended to stop following the airing of "The Music Hole". However, after the airing of "Preboot" and "Reboot", their episode coverage returned due to popular demand.

Islands was met with mostly positive reviews. Many criticssuch as Zack Smith of Newsarama and Oliver Sava of The A.V. Clubapplauded how the miniseries started with quirky adventure episodes before culminating in an emotional finale. Other critics complimented the greater development of the miniseries' characters. Zach Blumenfeld of Paste Magazine complimented the miniseries' philosophical musings, which he argued "takes on shades of Black Mirror and existentialism to cast a critical eye on technology and the human spirit."

In April 2017, Common Sense Media awarded the Islands miniseries The Common Sense Seal, calling it a "beautiful animated miniseries [that] explores a deep backstory." In July 2017, the Islands episode "Imaginary Resources" won a Primetime Creative Arts Emmy Awards for Outstanding Individual Achievement in Animation at the 69th Primetime Creative Arts Emmy Awards.

Episodes

Home media
Warner Home Video released several DVD compilations that contain episodes from the eighth season. The first was Card Wars, released on July 12, 2016. The second release, Islands—which included all of the titular miniseries—was released on DVD on January 24, 2017. This release was notable because it marked the second time that Adventure Time episodes had been released on DVD before officially airing on Cartoon Network. The first instance was the release of the episode "Princess Day" on the DVD of the same name on July 29, 2014, before it first aired on TV on July 31, 2014).

US release

A DVD set that includes season eight along with seasons nine and ten was released in the United States on September 4, 2018.

Australian release

On November 28, 2018, the season was released by itself on DVD and Blu-ray in Australia.

Notes

References

Adventure Time seasons
2016 American television seasons
2017 American television seasons